Fusinus hernandezi is a species of sea snail, a marine gastropod mollusc in the family Fasciolariidae.

References

hernandezi
Gastropods described in 2009